Napperby Station, also known as Napperby, is a  pastoral lease used as a cattle station in the Northern Territory of Australia.

History
The station was established on Anmatyerre tribal land. The Chisholm family have owned Napperby Station "on and off" since 1948.

Non-exclusive Native title was granted by the Federal Court of Australia to the Anmatyerr and Arrernte people over Napperby Station in 2013 by consent. Both claims were first filed in 2005 after mining leases were granted in the area. The Central Land Council submitted new applications for native title rights over the whole pastoral lease in 2011. The court sat at the small local community of Laramba.

Current use

 the station was managed by Roy and Janet Chisholm. They run Santa Gertrudis cattle on the property.

Notable people
Artist Clifford Possum Tjapaltjarri was born at Napperby in 1932.

Artist Billy Stockman Tjapaltjarri was raised on the station.

See also
List of ranches and stations

References

Pastoral leases in the Northern Territory